Something Borrowed, Something New is an American reality television series that premiered February 8, 2013, on TLC. Hosted by Kelly Nishimoto and Sam Saboura, brides-to-be are able to choose between a new designer dress or their reimagined heirloom.

On April 18, 2014, the series was renewed for a third season, which premiered on October 10, 2014.

Episodes

Season 1 (2013)

Season 2 (2014)

Season 3 (2014)

References

2010s American reality television series
2013 American television series debuts
English-language television shows
TLC (TV network) original programming